The utility electricity sector in Bangladesh has one national grid with an installed capacity of 25,700 MW as of June 2022. Bangladesh's energy sector is not up to the mark. However, per capita energy consumption in Bangladesh is considered higher than the production. Electricity was introduced to the country on 7th of December, 1901 under British rule.

Electricity is the major source of power for most of the country's economic activities. Bangladesh's total installed electricity generation capacity (including captive power) is 25,700 MW. It was 15,351 megawatts (MW) as of January 2017 and 20,000 megawatts in 2018.

The largest energy consumers in Bangladesh are industries and the residential sector, followed by the commercial and agricultural sectors.

Bangladesh will need an estimated 34,000 MW of power by 2030 to sustain its economic growth of over 7 percent.

Problems in Bangladesh's electric power sector include high system losses, delays in completion of new plants, low plant efficiency, erratic power supply, electricity theft, blackouts, and shortages of funds for power plant maintenance. Overall, the country's generation plants have been unable to meet system demand over the past decade.

On the 2nd of November, 2014, electricity was restored after a day-long nationwide blackout. A transmission line from India had failed, which "led to a cascade of failures throughout the national power grid," and criticism of "old grid infrastructure and poor management." However, in a recent root-cause analysis report the investigating team has clarified that the fault was actually due to lack of coordination and poor health of transmission and distribution infrastructure that caused the blackout.

On 4 October 2022, 70–80% of the country's 168 million residence were hit with blackouts and only 45% of residences were restored with power by nightfall. There was a shortage of natural gas because of the 2021–present global energy crisis where 77 natural gas power plants had insufficient fuel to meet demand. The electricity sector in Bangladesh is heavily reliant on natural gas.
The government stopped buying spot price liquefied natural gas in June 2022; they were importing 30% of their LNG on the spot market this year down from 40% last year. They are still importing LNG on futures exchange markets.

Sources of energy
In fact, more than three-quarters of the nation's commercial energy demand is being met by natural gas. This influential sector caters for around 40% of the power plant feed-stock, 17% of industries, 15% captive power, 11% for domestic and household usage, another 11% for fertilizers, 5% in Compressed natural gas (CNG) activities and 1% for commercial and agricultural uses.

CNG is substituting more than US$0.8 billion worth of foreign exchange annually and is also used in most vehicles on the road. In addition to CNG, Liquefied Petroleum Gas (LPG) is also demanded at around 0.1 million tons. The nation furthermore demands 3.5 million tons of oil imports in addition to almost 2 million tons of diesel to feed oil-based power plants being planned and built all around the country. The additional petroleum and coal imports are causing a disruption in the GDP by as much as 2% annually. The new purchases are affecting improvement initiatives in other sectors causing reduced export earnings and curtailing employment opportunities. This massive failure in the energy sector is mostly attributed to prolonged negligence, inappropriate implementation, inefficiency and lack of planning. To make matters worse, natural gas reserves are expected to expire by 2020. The only coal mine of the country is in the development stage, the reserve of which is also expected to dry up anywhere from 75 to 80 years after the start of their operations.

Efforts to develop an open-pit coal mine in Phulbari, Dinajpur District, have met with large, violent protests in 2006 because of feared environmental effects, and six people were killed and hundreds injured. At the time, the government closed the project, for which it was working with Asia Energy (now Global Coal Resources). It was encouraged in December 2009 to re-open it by the United States ambassador in private communication. In October 2010 protesters make a week-long march from Phulbari to Dhaka against the mine; a coalition of other groups protested at a Global Coal Resources meeting in London.

Renewable energy

According to the Bangladesh's Power Sector Master Plan 2016 (PSMP–2016), the country has the potential to generate a combined 3.6 GW of electricity from renewable energy sources. Another research has estimated that the potential from wind power alone stands at 20 GW.

Bangladesh has 15 MW solar energy capacity through rural households and 1.9 MW wind power in Kutubdia and Feni. The government of Bangladesh has approved the construction by private developers of 19 on-grid solar parks, with would have cumulative generation capacity of 1070 MW. A solar power plant having a power generation capacity of 28 MW has recently started its operation in Teknaf of Cox's Bazar. Accounting this, the power generation capacity from renewable energy sources exceeds five percent of the country's total demand.
Technical Solartech Energy Ltd (TSEL) has installed this power plant in Teknaf utilizing a total of 116 acres of land. Currently, the power plant is feeding 20MW to the national grid.

Bangladesh has planned to produce 10% of total power generation by 2020 from renewable energy sources like wind, waste, and solar energy. The country plans to increase its renewable energy share to 17% by 2041 under its Intended Nationally Determined Contribution (INDC) commitment to reduce greenhouse gas emissions by 5% until 2030.

The country's prospect of geothermal energy extraction has also been discussed by researchers. Studies carried out by geologists suggested geothermal resources in northwest and southeast region.

Recent plans

The Ministry of Power and Energy has been mobilising BDT 400 billion ($5.88 billion) to generate 5,000 MW of electricity to reduce load shedding into a tolerable level within next four and half years during the term of the present government. Under the plan, the Bangladesh Power Development Board (BPDB) would produce 500 MW gas-fired electricity between July and December 2009 to over come load shedding within December. The PDB would hire furnace-oil based 1,000 MW of electricity from private sector from January to June 2010, the plan said. In 2011, the government would install furnace-oil based 800 MW capacity of power plant.

The PDB officials would seek suitable place to establish the plant, a senior official of the PDB said. Besides the government would also hire another diesel- or furnace oil-based power plant having capacity of 700 MW in 2012 to keep load shedding into mild level, the official said. However, the government also contemplates to establish four coal-fired-based power plants with capacity of producing 500 MW of electricity each with public and private partnership (PPP) in Rajshahi and Chittagong region.

The government has initially tried to create fund of BDT 60 billion ($1 billion) to implement the plan, sources said. The power division has tried to use the government's budgetary allocation of BDT 20 billion for PPP in this regard, sources added. "If we can create the fund of BDT 60 billion, it would be possible also to mobilise BDT 400 billion under ppp to produce 5,000 MW of electricity within four and half years," PDB chairman ASM Alamgir Kabir told the New Nation on 29 June 2009. During the meeting, Prime Minister Sheikh Hasina permitted the power division to implement the PDB plan to reduce load shedding up to a tolerable level. Prime Minister's Adviser for Power and Energy Dr. Tawfiq-e-Elahi Chowdhury Bir Bikram, State Minister for Power and Energy Shamsul Haque Tuku, Power Division Secretary Md Abul Kalam, PDB chairman ASM Alamgir Kabir were present.

Inefficiencies and infrastructure

Bangladesh has small reserves of oil and coal, but very large natural gas resources. Commercial energy consumption comes mostly from natural gas (around 66%), followed by oil, hydropower, and coal. Non-commercial energy sources, such as wood fuel, and crop residues, are estimated to account for over half of the country's energy consumption.

A 2014 news report stated that:
Bangladesh is considered one of the most energy-poor nations, with one of the lowest per capita electricity consumption rates in the world. More than a third of Bangladesh's 166 million people still have no access to electricity, while the country often is able to produce only some of its 11,500-megawatt generation capacity.
In generating and distributing electricity, the failure to adequately manage the load leads to extensive load shedding which results in severe disruption in the industrial production and other economic activities. A recent survey reveals that power outages result in a loss of industrial output worth $1 billion a year which reduces the GDP growth by about half a percentage point in Bangladesh. A major hurdle in efficiently delivering power is caused by the inefficient distribution system. It is estimated that the total transmission and distribution losses in Bangladesh amount to one-third of the total generation, the value of which is equal to US$247 million per year.

In 2011, there were proposals to upgrade the grid technologies to digital smart metering systems and investing in renewable energy technologies to produce 5% of total power generation by 2015 & 10% by 2020, as noted in the National Renewable Energy Policy of 2008. American engineer Sanwar Sunny said that the city should put more effort in zoning areas to encourage more self-reliant subdivisions and higher density housing around subways to be more sustainable, as during peak times load shedding would not affect everyone. It will reduce effects of power cuts and provide stability to the power sector. He proposed that Radio transmitters could be operating remotely in unlicensed radio bands using two way real time communication and transmit coded instructions from the central to the circuit breakers in selected coordinates of the micro grids substations thereby maintain multiple power flow lines with automated control and digital metering. Using this technology, Feed-in tariffs (FIT) would also be possible, as the energy usage could be monitored remotely and private power generation and energy efficient entities could be offered rebates and incentives. "This will also expedite investments in this sector, create job opportunities for engineering graduates and technicians, and ease pressures on the government" he said. Think tanks such as Bangladesh Solar Energy Society and Renewable Energy Institute (REI), along with European International Development Government Agencies such as Deutsche Gesellschaft für Internationale Zusammenarbeit supported this scheme. However, The Secretary of the Ministry of Power, Government of Bangladesh has said that the government has no plans to do so.

Nuclear Power 

To ensure growing energy supply and reducing ghg emission, Bangladesh sees Nuclear energy as a viable option.

To this fact, the govt of Bangladesh has already started construction of the Rooppur Nuclear Power Plant. It will be a 2.4 GWe nuclear power plant and will be the country's first. The power plant is being constructed at Rooppur of Pabna District, on the bank of the river Padma, 87 miles (140 km) west of Dhaka. The first of the two unit is expected to go into operation in 2024. Once completed, the plant is expected to generate around 15% of the nation's electricity demand.

2nd Nuclear Plant 

The current government has decided to construct a 2nd nuclear plant in the southern part of the country.  
The possible sites are - Gangamati in Patuakhali, Majher Char in Barguna, Boyar Char in Noakhali and Muhurir Char in Feni. The project is still in early stage of development. Russian, Chinese and Korean companies has expressed interest to build and finance the project.

See also

 Bangladesh Energy Regulatory Commission
 Bangladesh Power Development Board
 List of power stations in Bangladesh
 Power Grid Company of Bangladesh

References

 
 Islam, 2003 M. Islam, Energy efficiency potentials in the power sector of Bangladesh. 2003 Renewable Energy Information Network (REIN), Local Government Engineering Department (LGED), Bangladesh (2003).
 Alam et al., 2004 M.S. Alam, E. Kabir, M.M. Rahman and M.A.K. Chowdhury, Power sector reform in Bangladesh: electricity distribution system, Energy 29 (2004), pp. 1773–1783

External links

Energy in Bangladesh
Electric power in Bangladesh